Westwood Motorsport Park (or Westwood Racing Circuit) was a  8-turn motorsport race track located in Coquitlam, British Columbia on the southern slopes of Eagle Mountain (known locally as Eagle Ridge).

History

The track was built and operated by the Sports Car Club of British Columbia (SCCBC). Construction of Westwood began in 1957, and the first race was held on July 26, 1959, making it the first purpose-built permanent road course in Canada.

Westwood hosted many different professional race series over the years, including long stints with the Formula Atlantic Series, Trans-Am Series, and Player's GM Challenge Series. Champion drivers to have raced professionally at Westwood include Formula One World Champion Keke Rosberg, Indianapolis 500 winners Bobby Rahal and Danny Sullivan, as well as other famous names including Gilles Villeneuve and Michael Andretti.

The December 12, 1988 episode of MacGyver, titled Collision Course, was primarily filmed at Westwood (where it was referred to as the Westwood Springs Race Course). The Player's GM Challenge Series served as the backdrop of the story.

The track, which was located on leased provincial crown land, eventually fell victim to urban development. The track finally closed in 1990 to make way for the Westwood Plateau housing development and the Westwood Plateau Golf & Country Club.

Lap records

The fastest official race lap records at the Westwood Motorsport Park are listed as:

Major Race Results

CASC / SCCA Atlantic Championship

SCCA Trans-Am Series

See also
 List of auto racing tracks in Canada

External links
http://www.etracksonline.co.uk/Features/stories/canadaspioneer.html
http://www.sccbc.net/about.htm
http://www.playerschallengeseries.ca/
www.darrenturner.ca/ Canon Yokohama Formula Fords racing at Westwood

References
 Johnston, Tom, Westwood, Everyone's Favourite Racing Circuit, Granville Island Publishing, 

Sports venues in Coquitlam
Defunct motorsport venues in Canada
Motorsport venues in British Columbia